SR9009, also known as Stenabolic, is a research drug that was developed by professor Thomas Burris of the Scripps Research Institute as an agonist of  Rev-ErbA (i.e., increases the constitutive repression of genes regulated by Rev-ErbA) with a half-maximum inhibitory concentration (IC50) = 670 nM for Rev-ErbAα and IC50 = 800 nM for Rev-ErbAβ.

Activation of Rev-ErbA-α by SR9009 in mice increases exercise capacity by increasing mitochondria counts in skeletal muscle.

Abuse of SR9009 has been reported within the bodybuilding community, resulting in SR9009 being placed on the World Anti-Doping Agency list of prohibited drugs. SR9009 and the related SR9011 drug are described as "Hormone and Metabolic Modulators".

See also 
 GSK4112
 GW501516
 SR8278
 SR9011

References

Amines
Benzene derivatives
Experimental drugs
Thiophenes